The name Zelia has been used for two tropical cyclones worldwide, both in the Australian Region:

 Cyclone Zelia (1998) – An early-season tropical cyclone which affected no land areas.
 Cyclone Zelia (2011) – A strong tropical cyclone which crossed into the South Pacific basin and affected New Zealand as a post-tropical system.

See also
Cyclone Delia (1963), another tropical cyclone in the Australian Region with a similar name

Australian region cyclone set index articles